The deans in the Church of England are the senior Anglican clergy who head the chapter of a collegiate church (almost all of which are cathedrals). If they are dean of the diocesan chapter, they are the senior priest of the diocese and often also undertake some other diocesan and civic duties in the area. , there are 46 deans (including vacancies): 44 of cathedrals plus the two royal peculiars.

Deans

Acting deans

See also
List of bishops in the Church of England
List of archdeacons in the Church of England

Resignations and retirements

Notes

See also

References

 01
.
Church of England Deans
Deans, Church of England
Church of England lists